Kansas Territory is a 1952 American Western film directed by Lewis D. Collins and starring Wild Bill Elliott, House Peters Jr. and Peggy Stewart. It was partly shot at the Iverson Ranch. The film's sets were designed by the art director Dave Milton.

Cast
Wild Bill Elliott as Joe Daniels
House Peters Jr. as Ralph Carruthers
Peggy Stewart as Kay Collins
Lane Bradford as Fred Jethro
I. Stanford Jolley as Slater
Fuzzy Knight as Cap
Stanley Andrews as Governor
Marshall Reed as Deputy Bob Jethro
Terry Frost as Henchman Stark
John Hart as U.S. Marshal Matt Furness
William Fawcett as Old Man Weatherbee
Lee Roberts as Arthur Larkin
Pierce Lyden as Dr. Stanley Johnson
Ted Adams as Ed Rank

References

External links

1952 Western (genre) films
American Western (genre) films
Films directed by Lewis D. Collins
Monogram Pictures films
American black-and-white films
Films scored by Raoul Kraushaar
1950s English-language films
1950s American films